Diabolical Streak is the second studio album by American neo-cabaret artist Jill Tracy, released in 1999.

Track listing

1999 albums
Jill Tracy albums